Sandali-ye Gav Mishi (also Romanized as Şandalī-ye Gāv Mīshī) is a village in Howmeh-ye Gharbi Rural District, in the Central District of Ramhormoz County, Khuzestan Province, Iran. At the 2006 census, its population was 364, in 66 families.

References 

Populated places in Ramhormoz County